The Orlické Mountains or Eagle Mountains  are a mountain range located mainly in northeastern Bohemia in the Czech Republic, forming a subgroup of the Central Sudetes. They follow the border with Klodzko Land in Poland for 25 miles (40 km). The mountains are mainly composed of crystalline rocks, consistent with the makeup of the northern rim of the highlands of Bohemia. The highest point in the range is Velká Deštná, at 1,115 m (3,658 ft).

Tourism 

The entire region has maintained its original natural character over the centuries and so beech primeval forests, protected landscape areas or nature parks and reserves are interwoven with trails, right next to chateaux and town parks and groomed rural gardens. The gentle rolling hills are interlaced with hiking trails, a dense network of cycle trails and routes leading along rivers.

Protections 
Most of the Eagle Mountains are part of the Orlické Mountains Protected Landscape Area (CHKO Orlické hory), a landscape park of 204 km2 established in 1969.

History

Until 1945 the Eagle Mountains were predominantly German populated, the population was expropriated and expelled from their homeland. Subsequently, new citizens moved here from the Czech lands.

References

External links 

 EagleMountains.cz - official tourist portal of the region operated by local destination agency
 Protected landscape area administration authority

Sudetes
Mountain ranges of Poland
Mountain ranges of the Czech Republic